The 2017–18 Coupe de France preliminary rounds, Grand-Est make up the qualifying competition to decide which teams from the French Grand-Est region take part in the main competition from the seventh round.

First round 
The first round qualifiers for the regional league of Grand Est were organised separately by the three constituent sectors.

Alsace 
The matches in Alsace were played between 12 and 17 August 2017.

First round results: Alsace

Champagne-Ardenne 

The matches in Champagne-Ardenne were played on 20 August 2017.

First round results: Champagne-Ardenne

Lorraine 
The matches in Lorraine were played to be played between 24 May and 13 August 2017. Tiers shown reflect the 2016–17 season.

First round results: Lorraine

Second round

Alsace 
These matches were played on 19 and 20 August 2017.

Second round results: Alsace

Champagne-Ardenne 
These matches were played on 27 August 2017.

Second round results: Champagne-Ardenne

Lorraine 
These matches were played between 19 and 23 August 2017.

Second round results: Lorraine

Third round

Alsace 
These matches were played on 9 and 10 September 2017.

Third round results: Alsace

Champagne-Ardenne 
These matches were played on 10 September 2017.

Third round results: Champagne-Ardenne

Lorraine 
These matches were played between 9 and 10 September 2017.

Third round results: Lorraine

Fourth round

Alsace 
These matches were played on 23 and 24 September 2017.

Fourth round results: Alsace

Champagne-Ardenne 
These matches were played on 24 September 2017.

Fourth round results: Champagne-Ardenne

Lorraine 
These matches were played on 23 and 24 September 2017.

Fourth round results: Lorraine

Intermediate round

Alsace 
These matches were played on 1 October 2017.

Intermediate round results: Alsace

Fifth round

Alsace 
These matches were played on 7 and 8 October 2017.

Fifth round results: Alsace

Champagne-Ardenne 
These matches were played on 8 October 2017.

Fifth round results: Champagne-Ardenne

Lorraine 
These matches were played on 7 and 8 October 2017.

Fifth round results: Lorraine

Sixth round 
The three sectors in Grand Est region were combined for the sixth round.

These matches were played on 21 and 22 October 2017.

Sixth round results: Grand Est

Notes

References 

Coupe de France
Football in Grand Est
2017–18 Coupe de France